The Kattang Nature Reserve is a protected nature reserve that is located in the Mid North Coast region of New South Wales, on the eastern coast of Australia.

Features
The reserve has a variety of different vegetation communities, such as exposed headlands, dry eucalyptus woodland, wet and dry heathland. Two small littoral rainforest patches remain, they are floristically similar to those at Sea Acres National Park not far to the north. There is speculation that the extremely rare Scented Acronychia grows at Kattang. Perpendicular Point has cliffs that descend  suddenly to the sea below. Bushwalking is popular, particularly in late winter and early spring when the abundant wildflowers are in season.

See also

 Protected areas of New South Wales

References

External links

Forests of New South Wales
Mid North Coast
Nature reserves in New South Wales
1984 establishments in Australia
Protected areas established in 1984